John Blair may refer to:

Politics
 John Blair Sr. (1687–1771), American merchant and politician in the colony of Virginia
 John Blair Jr. (1732–1800), American politician, Founding Father and jurist
 John Blair (Tennessee politician) (1790–1863), American politician
 John Blair (Northern Ireland politician) (born 1966), Member of the Legislative Assembly for South Antrim
 John Knox Blair (1873–1950), Canadian politician, physician and teacher
 John Rutherford Blair (1843–1914), New Zealand politician

Sports
 John Blair (1890s footballer), Scottish footballer active 1894–1899
 John Blair (footballer, born 1898) (1898–1971), Scottish footballer (Partick Thistle)
 John Blair (English footballer), top scorer in the 1923–24 Oldham Athletic A.F.C. season
 John Blair (footballer, born 1905) (1905–1974), Scottish footballer (Third Lanark, Tottenham Hotspur, Sheffield United)
 John Blair (footballer, born 1910) (1910–c. 1975), Scottish footballer (Motherwell and Scotland)
 John Blair (Australian footballer) (born 1955), Australian rules footballer
 John Blair (rugby union) (c. 1871–1911), New Zealand rugby union player

Other
 John Blair (historian) (born 1955), British historian, archaeologist, and academic
 John Blair (pastor) (1720–1771), Presbyterian minister
 John Blair (priest) (died 1782), British clergyman and chronologist
 John Blair (writer) (born 1961), American poet, novelist, and short-story writer
 John Blair (musician), American violinist on the 1973 album Song of the New World
John Blair (painter) (1849–1934), Scottish painter
 John Hamilton Blair (1889–1972), Scottish mariner
 John Hunter Blair (1903–1964), British television producer
 John Insley Blair (1802–1899), American entrepreneur, railroad magnate, and philanthropist
 John Leo Blair (1888–1962), American businessman
 John T. Blair (1885–1976), American architect and builder

See also
John Hamilton of Blair, 17th-century Scottish bishop
John Insley Blair Larned (1881–1955), American Episcopal bishop
Jon Blair (born 1950), South African-born writer and filmmaker
Jon Blair Hunter, American politician active 1996–2008